Benjamin Brown (born July 1, 1966 in Tel Aviv) is an Israeli professor, researcher of Judaism and Jewish thought, lecturer at the Department of Jewish thought at Hebrew University and a researcher at the Israel Democracy Institute. Brown is known for his studies on Orthodox Judaism, especially the ultra-Orthodox community, from the theological, Jewish-legal and historical perspectives.  Among other topics, he was the first to trace the development of the concept Daas Torah and its various usages in the Haredi (ultra-Orthodox) world. In addition, he published many papers about the Jewish legal ruling system (Halakhah), the Musar movement and the Hasidic movement. In his studies, Brown incorporates concepts, models and analytical tools originating from general philosophy, including legal philosophy.

References

 Brown's Academia.edu  page: https://huji.academia.edu/BBrown
 Brown's "Thoughts and Ways of Thinking" (open access) at the Ubiquity Press website

1966 births
Living people
Israeli Jews
Academic staff of the Hebrew University of Jerusalem
People from Bnei Brak
Scientists from Tel Aviv
Judaic scholars
Hebrew University of Jerusalem alumni